Francis Kirps is a Luxembourgian writer. He studied Psychology at the University of Strasbourg. Some of his early writings appeared in the cultural journal Cahiers Luxembourgeois. He has published two short story collections titled Planet Luxembourg ("Planet Luxemburg" in the original German), and The Mutations ("Die Mutationen"). He also has a novel to his name (Die Klasse von 77, 2016). His work has been published in various anthologies and contemporary short story collections.

Kirps won the EU Prize for Literature for The Mutations. He has been nominated for the Concours Littéraire National prize in his native country. He contributes to literary magazines such as EXOT and newspapers like taz.

Kirps lives and works in Lintgen.

References

Luxembourgian writers
University of Strasbourg alumni
People from Mersch (canton)
Living people
Year of birth missing (living people)